Ofelia Zepeda (born in Stanfield, Arizona, 1952) is a Tohono O'odham poet and intellectual. She is Regents' Professor of Tohono O'odham language and linguistics and Director of the American Indian Language Development Institute (AILDI)  at The University of Arizona. Zepeda is the editor for Sun Tracks, a series of books that focuses on the work of Native American artists and writers, published by the University of Arizona Press.

Life
Zepeda is a professor of linguistics at the University of Arizona and is well known for her efforts in the preservation of and the promotion of literacy in Tohono O'odham. She served as director of the American Indian Studies Program at the University of Arizona from 1986 to 1991. She is a consultant and advocate on behalf of a number of American indigenous languages. She is the author of A Papago Grammar and co-author of the article "Derived Words in Tohono O'odham", published in the International Journal of American Linguistics. She was a student of MIT linguistics professor Ken Hale.

Zepeda has worked with her tribe to improve literacy in both English and Tohono O'odham. In 1983, she developed A Papago Grammar from tapes of Native speakers because no textbook existed for the classes she taught. Her work with the reservation committee for Tohono O'odham language policy yielded an official policy that encourages the speaking of the Native language at all grade levels.

In 1995 she published a book of poetry, Ocean Power: Poems from the Desert, and she titled the introduction, "Things That Help Me Begin to Remember".

In 1999, Zepeda received a MacArthur Fellowship. She was a member of the literary advisory committee for Sun Tracks, a publishing program featuring Native American works, and is the series editor. In 2012, her book of poetry was banned by Tucson schools.

Works

References

External links
 Interview with Ofelia Zepeda on Where Clouds are Formed by Christopher Nelson , November 30, 2008
 Poems by Zepeda, and recording of her appearance on All Things Considered, NPR, April 26, 2001
 Ofelia Zepeda's author page on ''Storytellers: Native American Authors Online

1952 births
Living people
University of Arizona faculty
Native American writers
Tohono O'odham people
MacArthur Fellows
Linguists from the United States
People from Pinal County, Arizona
Poets from Arizona
American women poets
Writers from Tucson, Arizona
20th-century American poets
20th-century American women writers
21st-century American poets
21st-century American women writers
American textbook writers
Women textbook writers
Linguists of Uto-Aztecan languages
20th-century linguists
21st-century linguists
Women linguists
Native American linguists
American women academics
20th-century Native Americans
21st-century Native Americans
20th-century Native American women
21st-century Native American women
Native American people from Arizona